The 1933 Manchester Rusholme by-election was held on 21 November 1933.  The by-election was held due to the appointment to high court of the incumbent Conservative MP, Frank Merriman.  It was won by the Conservative candidate Edmund Radford.

Candidates
The executive of the local Liberal association voted by a majority, not to put forward a candidate for the by-election. However, Dr Percy McDougall was nominated and ran as an unofficial Liberal candidate.

Result

Aftermath
McDougall stood again at the 1935 general election as an Independent candidate.

References

1933 in England
1933 elections in the United Kingdom
Rusholme 1933
1930s in Manchester